Gnon-Sangdong is a small village under Hee-Gyathang GPU in Dzongu subdivision, Mangan, Sikkim, India. The Ministry of Home Affairs has given it a geographical code of 260883.

References

Cities and towns in Mangan district